{{Speciesbox
| image = Hierodula quinquepatellata.jpg
| genus = Hierodula
| species = quinquepatellata
| authority = Werner, 1911
| display_parents = 3
| synonyms = * 'Hierodula sapitina Giglio-Tos, 1912
}}Hierodula quinquepatellata'' is a species of praying mantis in the family Mantidae.

References

quinquepatellata
Articles created by Qbugbot
Insects described in 1911